is a Japanese football player.

Club statistics
Updated to 23 February 2020.

References

External links
Profile at Roasso Kumamoto

1989 births
Living people
Ritsumeikan University alumni
Association football people from Kanagawa Prefecture
Japanese footballers
J2 League players
J3 League players
Ehime FC players
Roasso Kumamoto players
Ococias Kyoto AC players
Association football midfielders